Robert Simpson (18 August 1910 – 11 November 1990) was a Canadian politician, a Progressive Conservative member of the House of Commons of Canada. He was born in Cannington Manor, Saskatchewan and became a clerk and miner by career.

He was first elected at the Churchill riding in
the 1957 general election, then re-elected there in 1958, 1962, 1963, 1965 and 1968. He served in the House of Commons from the 23rd through 28th Canadian Parliaments. He retired from politics at the 1972 election.

Electoral history

References

External links
 

1910 births
1990 deaths
Members of the House of Commons of Canada from Manitoba
Progressive Conservative Party of Canada MPs